Aroona Dam is a reservoir in the Australian state of South Australia located in the gazetted locality of Leigh Creek about  west of the locality’s town centre.

The origin of its name is not mentioned in sources.  However, the word ‘Aroona’ is listed in the official government place name gazetteer as the name of some geographic features either adjoining the dam or located within its extent.  A mountain, Mount Aroona, is located in the ridge on the north side of the dam’s lake.  A former water feature is now located “under the waters of the Aroona Dam” is named as the Aroona Waterhole as well as having the Adnyamathanha name of Arrunha Awi.

It was designed and built by the Electricity Trust of South Australia from 1952 to 1957 by damming the Arrunha Creek (also known as Aroona Creek in one source and as Scott Creek in another source) and using a labour force consisting mainly of immigrants engaged by contract for two-years and which peaked at a maximum of 160 men.  Two shifts were scheduled during the winter months while concrete pouring was not conducted between November and March due to “extreme heat.”

In 2004, it was reported as storing and supplying water to “Leigh Creek, Copley and Lyndhurst, the coalfield and several neighbouring pastoral properties” and this was being augmented in respect to Leigh Creek by water pumped from bores about 6 km south of the town. However, in late 2016, it was advised that “water from Aroona dam will not be used for the town water supply” and that water from the bores would be treated in a reverse osmosis desalination plant located near the Leigh Creek township and used.

In April 2017, in conjunction with initiatives underway for the future re-use of the Leigh Creek township after the closure of the Leigh Creek Coalfield in November 2015, the South Australian government commenced a study to investigate the “potential for shore-based recreational fishing access.”

See also
List of reservoirs and dams in Australia

References

External links
Mountain Spring, The Flinders Range produced by the Commonwealth Film Unit in 1956; Aroona Dam featured between 3:15 and 3:43 minutes.

Gravity dams
Dams in South Australia
Reservoirs in South Australia
Dams completed in 1957
1957 establishments in Australia
Far North (South Australia)
Flinders Ranges